The Round Hainan Regatta is an annual sailing regatta in Hainan, China. Founded in 2010 by the Chinese Yachting Association (CYA).

References

External links

2010 establishments in China
Annual sporting events in China
Tourist attractions in Haikou
Recurring sporting events established in 2010
Sailing regattas
Sport in Hainan